This article provides details of international football games played by the South Korea national football team from 2020 to present.

Results by year

Results

2020

2021

2022

2023

See also
 South Korea national football team results

References

2020
2020s in South Korean sport